Blepharocarya is a genus of trees from northern Australia, in the family Anacardiaceae. They are dioecious trees with opposite leaves, a trait rather unusual within the Anacardiaceae.

Species include:

Blepharocarya depauperata  Specht 
Blepharocarya involucrigera  F.Muell.

References

External links

Anacardiaceae
Endemic flora of Australia
Trees of Australia
Anacardiaceae genera
Dioecious plants